The 1998 Robocup 2D Soccer Simulation League was a simulated soccer competition contested in the 1st Annual RoboCup International Symposium, held in Paris, France.

Round stage

Group A

Group B

Group C

Group D

Group E

Group F

Group G

Group H

Knockout stage

Honours

See also
 RoboCup
 RoboCup Simulation League
 RoboCup 3D Soccer Simulation League

External links
 RoboCup Soccer Simulator Wiki
 Team Assistant for 3D Visualisation
 Official Data Repository (Log Files, Team Binaries...)

RoboCup
Robot soccer competitions
1998 in robotics